Brilliance Books was a small publisher of gay and lesbian books based in Clerkenwell, London, founded in 1982 with funding from the GLC. It published a range of fiction and non-fiction works including David Wurtzel's Thomas Lyster: a Cambridge Novel and Title Fight, the account of UK newspaper Gay News by Gillian E. Hanscombe and its co-founder Andrew Lumsden. It also re-published earlier works of gay and lesbian literature, including Alice B. Toklas' The Alice B. Toklas Cook Book, and a 1984 edition of The Chinese Garden by Rosemary Manning originally published in 1961.

The publisher was run by Roy Trevelion and Tenebris Light. Author Jeanette Winterson worked as the women's editor there in 1983.

References 

Book publishing companies of the United Kingdom
LGBT organisations in London
LGBT culture in London